Chittagong Medical College (CMC) is situated in the port city of Chattogram, Bangladesh and is the oldest medical college in the south-eastern part of the country. It is affiliated with a tertiary level hospital where clinical students are trained in medicine, surgery, obstetrics and gynaecology and other sub-specialties.

History 
Chittagong Medical College Hospital was established at the present site in 1960 with only 120 beds and the outpatient services. At that time the young hospital housed only the Departments of Surgery and Gynecology and Obstetrics. Chittagong Hospital Housed the department of Medicine and allied specialties still 1969 and thereafter it remained affiliated with Chittagong Medical College Hospital as one of its teaching hospitals.

Construction of the present purpose-built six-storied CMCH was completed in 1969, which now accommodates all the clinical Departments including all their subspecialties. The hospital, which had a capacity of 500 beds initially, gradually increased its strength to 750 and finally to 1313. It runs outpatient departments in various specialties The independent turnover in 1999 was about 50,000. Over 18,000 surgical operations were performed that year.

As years passed, new treatment facilities kept being added and at present a nuclear medicine Centre for diagnostic and therapeutic purposes, a coronary care unit, an endoscopy unit, a kidney dialyzing unit, a Model Family Planning Centre, a Centre for Extended Program for Immunisation (EPI) are among the many facilities available to the in- and outpatients.

Founding 
Maiden Principal Professor Altaf Uddin Ahmed, Minister of Health and Social Welfare (East Pakistan) Dhirendranath Datta, Sheikh Mujibur Rahman, Prime Minister Huseyn Shaheed Suhrawardy, District Magistrate MA Rashid, Police Super, Central Health Minister Zahirudddin (left to right) was present during the inauguration ceremony of Chittagong Medical College, 20 September 1957.

References

External links

 http://www.cmch.gov.bd

Medical colleges in Bangladesh
Colleges in Chittagong
Hospitals in Chittagong
Educational institutions established in 1957
1957 establishments in East Pakistan